John Smith (8 November 1835 – 29 May 1889) was an English cricketer.  Smith was a right-handed batsman who bowled right-arm medium pace.  He was born at Ruddington, Nottinghamshire.

Smith made two first-class appearances for Nottinghamshire in 1864, against Kent at Crystal Palace, and Surrey at The Oval.  Against Kent, Nottinghamshire won the toss and elected to bat first, making 143 all out, with Smith scoring 27 runs before he was dismissed leg before by Harry Fryer.  In response, Kent made 124 all out in their first-innings, with Smith taking the wicket of John Burton to finish with figures of 1/21 from eleven overs.  Responding in their second-innings, Nottinghamshire made 165 all out, with Smith being dismissed for a single run by Edgar Willsher.  Chasing 185 to win, Kent were dismissed in their second-innings for 110, losing by 74 runs.  In the match against Surrey at Trent Bridge, Nottinghamshire won the toss and elected to bat, making 107 all out in their first-innings, with Smith being dismissed for a duck by William Shepherd.  In response, Surrey made 127 all out in their second-innings, to which Nottinghamshire responded to in their second-innings by being dismissed for just 81, with Smith being dismissed for 2 runs by George Griffith.  Chasing just 62 for victory, Surrey narrowly reached their target with just a wicket to spare.

He later stood as an umpire in first-class cricket, standing in 39 matches between 1875 and 1882.  He died at Bury, Lancashire, on 29 May 1889.  His son, Arthur, was also a first-class cricketer.

References

External links
John Smith at ESPNcricinfo
John Smith at CricketArchive

1835 births
1889 deaths
People from Ruddington
Cricketers from Nottinghamshire
English cricketers
Nottinghamshire cricketers
English cricket umpires